Umesh Varshney (born 1957) is an Indian molecular biologist, academician and the head of a laboratory at the Indian Institute of Science, Bengaluru. He is a J. C. Bose National Fellow of the Department of Science and Technology and is known for his studies on protein synthesis and DNA repair in Escherichia coli and Mycobacterium tuberculosis. An elected fellow of the Indian Academy of Sciences, Indian National Science Academy and the National Academy of Sciences (India), he is also a recipient of the National Bioscience Award for Career Development of the Government of India. The Council of Scientific and Industrial Research, awarded him the Shanti Swarup Bhatnagar Prize for Science and Technology, one of the highest Indian science awards, in 2001, and then in 2014 with the G. N. Ramachandran Gold Medal for Excellence in Biological Sciences & Technology for his contributions to biological sciences.

Biography 
Umesh Varshney, born on 26 October 1957 in the Indian state of Uttar Pradesh, graduated in science from Jiwaji University in 1975 and completed his master's degree at G. B. Pant University of Agriculture and Technology in 1979. Moving to Canada, he did his doctoral studies on a Graduate Teaching Assistantship and Studentship by Alberta Heritage Foundation for Medical Research Foundation (AHFMR) under the guidance of Lashitew Gedamu and secured his doctoral degree from the University of Calgary in 1985. His post-doctoral studies were at the laboratory of Johan Hans van de Sande at the university and, later, at Massachusetts Institute of Technology with U. L. RajBhandary. Returning to India in 1991, he started his career at the Department of Microbiology and Cell Biology (then known as Centre for Genetic Engineering) of the Indian Institute of Science as an assistant professor, and promoted to associate professor (1997), professor (2002) and dean of the undergraduate programs and heads a laboratory while chairing the Department of Microbiology and Cell Biology of the Indian Institute of Science. He is also an honorary faculty at Jawaharlal Nehru Centre for Advanced Scientific Research since 1999 and is a collaborator of the Genome Metabolism and Biostruct Laboratory, Budapest. He is currently the Chairman of the division of Biological Sciences at the Indian Institute of Science, Bengaluru.

Legacy 
Varhsney's researches are primarily focused in the area of protein synthesis and DNA repair in Escherichia coli and Mycobacterium tuberculosis. His researches are known to have assisted in a wider understanding of the biology of mycobacterium, more specifically the interaction between ribosome recycling factor and elongation factor G as well as the uracil excision repair pathway. These studies are reported to have been aimed at developing newer drug targets and the attenuated strains. He has detailed his research findings by way of articles published in peer-reviewed journals and online scientific article repositories like ResearchGate, Google Scholar and PubFacts have listed many of them. He was one of the organizers of the 21st International tRNA Workshop held at Indian Institute of Science in December 2005, has guided several scholars in their doctoral researches and delivered keynote addresses at many science conferences.

Awards and honors 
In 1999, when the Department of Biotechnology of India instituted the National Bioscience Award for Career Development as one of the prestigious science awards in the country, Umesh Varshney was among the first recipients of the award. The Council of Scientific and Industrial Research awarded him the Shanti Swarup Bhatnagar Prize in 2001, and then in 2014 he was awarded the G. N. Ramachandran Gold Medal for Excellence in Biological Sciences & Technology. In 2001, he received the P. S. Sarma Memorial Award of the Society of Biological Chemists (India) (SBC. A life member of the SBC, he received the Life Sciences Research Award of Novo Nordisk Education Foundation in 2002 and the year 2008 brought him the elected fellowship of the Indian National Science Academy and the J. C. Bose National Fellowship of the Department of Science and Technology of India.

Selected bibliography

Notes

References

External links 
 
 

Recipients of the Shanti Swarup Bhatnagar Award in Biological Science
1957 births
Living people
Scientists from Madhya Pradesh
Jiwaji University alumni
University of Calgary alumni
Massachusetts Institute of Technology alumni
Academic staff of the Indian Institute of Science
Indian molecular biologists
Indian scientific authors
Fellows of the Indian Academy of Sciences
Fellows of the Indian National Science Academy
N-BIOS Prize recipients
20th-century Indian biologists